Deborah Borda (born 1949) is an American music executive who is the president and chief executive officer of the New York Philharmonic.

Education 
Borda was born on July 15, 1949, in New York. At age 12, she moved with her family to Boston.

She graduated from Bennington College with a BA in music in 1971, and studied at the Royal College of Music from 1972 to 1973.

Career 
After graduation, Borda moved to Greenwich Village and started to play  as a freelancer for ballet, Broadway shows and various orchestras. She was the assistant to the scheduling director of the Marlboro Music Festival in 1976.

She was previously the manager of The Handel and Haydn Society, an executive director of the Detroit Symphony Orchestra, president and managing director of the Saint Paul Chamber Orchestra, and both general manager and artistic administrator of the San Francisco Symphony.

Borda was the first David C. Bohnett Presidential Chair of the Los Angeles Philharmonic Association. This title stems from a $10 million endowment made by David Bohnett to the Los Angeles Philharmonic in 2014, "in honor of Deborah Borda's continuing accomplishments with the Los Angeles Philharmonic".

During her time with the Los Angeles Philharmonic, Borda oversaw the completion of the Walt Disney Concert Hall. and joined its board in 2010. Borda developed a strategic plan for the construction and financing of the hall, which ended in October 2003 at the opening ceremony.

Borda joined the Harvard Kennedy School's Center for Public Leadership as a Leader-In-Residence in 2015, making her the first fine arts executive to join the center.

Previously with the New York Philharmonic for eight seasons as its executive director, Borda spent 17 years as the president and chief executive officer of the Los Angeles Philharmonic before returning to the New York Philharmonic in 2017.

In 2020, Borda launched the largest women-only commissioning initiative in history, called Project 19. The project consists of 19 new works by 19 women composers.

Awards
 2007: John C. Argue Dickens Medal of Honor
 2015: Charles Flint Kellogg Award in Arts and Letters
 2017: Honorary doctorate of the Curtis Institute of Music, Philadelphia
 2018: Elected Member of the American Academy of Arts and Sciences
 2019: „Woman of Influence“ of the New York Business Journal
 2021: Honorary doctorate of the Manhattan School of Music, New York
 2021: Honorary doctorate of the New England Conservatory of Music, Boston

References

External links

, 2013
Deborah Borda on the website of the new conductors′ competition „La Maestra“ (women only)

Living people
Alumni of the Royal College of Music
American arts administrators
Bennington College alumni
New York Philharmonic
Women arts administrators
Year of birth missing (living people)